Safe as Houses is a Scottish television property programme on STV, hosted by sports broadcaster Ali Douglas and money advisor Fergus Muirhead.

The programme aimed to help viewers, whether they are a first time buyer or looking to expand their property empire.

Safe as Houses began airing on Thursday 19 July 2007, with the series ending on 6 September 2007.

References

2007 British television series debuts
2007 British television series endings
Property buying television shows
Television series by STV Studios